Dzyarzhynsk or Dzerzhinsk, formerly Koidanova or Koydanava, is a city in Minsk Region, Belarus, and the administrative center of Dzyarzhynsk District.

History
In the Middle Ages, the village belonged to the Radziwiłłs, a Polish–Lithuanian aristocratic family.

Jewish community

Jews lived in Koidanova as early as 1620. Koidanova became the site of a new Hasidic Jewish dynasty in 1833 when Rabbi Shlomo Chaim Perlow (1797–1862) became the first Koidanover Rebbe. He was succeeded by his son, Rabbi Boruch Mordechai Perlow (1818–1870), grandson, Rabbi Aharon Perlow (1839–1897), and great-grandson, Rabbi Yosef Perlow of Koidanov-Minsk (1854-1915), who was the last Koidanover Rebbe to live in the town. After World War I, the dynasty was moved to Baranovichi, then in Poland.

In 1847, Koidanova had 2,497 Jewish inhabitants.  In 1897 the city had a total population of 4,744, of whom 3,156 were Jews.

Inter-war period

In May 1932 it was granted the status of a city and was renamed Koidanau or Koydanov.  In June of that year it was renamed again as Dziaržynsk by the Communist authorities, in honour of Felix Dzerzhinsky (1877–1926), a famous Bolshevik creator and chief of the "Extraordinary Commission" (CHEKA) – the Soviet secret police - who was born in a Dziaržynava estate not far from the city, although on the other side of the then Polish-Soviet border.

The city was the capital of the short-lived Dzierzynszczyzna Polish Autonomous District during 1932–38.

World War II
It fell under German occupation during World War II. It was captured on 28 June 1941.

The Lithuanian Twelfth Schutzmannschaft (auxiliary police) Battalion's 1st Company, led by Lieutenant Z. Kemzura, massacred approximately 1,600 Jews from the city on 21 October 1941, shooting them and throwing them into a pit; many were buried alive.  As it is reported in The Complete Black Book of Russian Jewry: "For three hours the earth covering the mass grave would move; people still alive were trying to crawl out of their grave."  On 1–2 March 1942 the Einsatzgruppen transported several thousand Jews from throughout Belarussia and murdered them in Koidanov. The city was liberated by the Soviet Red Army on 6 July 1944.

Modern day

In 1998, the city had 24,700 inhabitants.

Now part of Belarus, the name Kojdanava is becoming popular again (it is the official name for the railway station of Dzyarzhynsk), but the official name remains unchanged.

Geography
The highest point of Belarus, Dzyarzhynskaya Hara, is several kilometers from Dzyarzhynsk.

Transport 
There is a rail route across the city from Minsk Passazhirsky to Baranovichi Polesskie.

There is only one bus route in Dziarzhynsk; there are 18 stops.

Sport
The local football club is the Arsenal Dzerzhinsk, playing in the Belarusian First League. Its home ground is the City Stadium.

Notable residents
 
Avrom Reyzen (1876–1953), Yiddish writer, poet, and editor
Joseph Schlossberg (1875–1971), American labor union activist
Aharon Perlow (1839–1897) – third rebbe of Koidanov
Karol Hutten-Czapski, Leliwa coat of arms, (1860-1904).  Polish Count and philanthropist. President of Minsk, Lithuania (1890-1901)
Emeryk Hutten-Czapski, Leliwa coat of arms, (1828–1896).  Polish Count, scholar, ardent historical collector and numismatist

References

External links 
 
 Dzerzhinsk (in Russian)
 Photos on Radzima.org
 Map of Dziaržynsk

Cities in Belarus
Populated places in Minsk Region
Dzyarzhynsk District
Minsk Voivodeship
Minsky Uyezd